Fernando Labourdette-Liaresq (born 2 December 1905, date of death unknown) was a Spanish athlete. He competed in the men's long jump at the 1928 Summer Olympics.

References

1905 births
Year of death missing
Athletes (track and field) at the 1928 Summer Olympics
Spanish male long jumpers
Olympic athletes of Spain
Place of birth missing